Other often refers to:
 Other (philosophy), a concept in psychology and philosophy

Other or The Other may also refer to:

Film and television
 The Other (1913 film), a German silent film directed by Max Mack
 The Other (1930 film), a German film directed by Robert Wiene
 The Other (1972 film), an American film directed by Robert Mulligan
 The Other (1999 film), a French-Egyptian film directed by Youssef Chahine
 The Other (2007 film), an Argentine-French-German film by Ariel Rotter
 The Other (Doctor Who), a fictional character in Doctor Who
 The Other (Marvel Cinematic Universe), a fictional character in the Marvel Cinematic Universe

Literature
 Other: British and Irish Poetry since 1970, a 1999 poetry anthology
 The Other (Applegate novel), a 2000 Animorphs novel by K.A. Applegate
 The Other (Tryon novel), a 1971 horror novel by Tom Tryon
 "The Other" (short story), a 1972 short story by Jorge Luis Borges
 The Other, a 2008 novel by David Guterson
 Spider-Man: "The Other", a 2005–2006 Marvel Comics crossover story arc

Music
 The Other (band), a German horror punk band
 Other (Alison Moyet album) or the title song, 2017
 Other (Lustmord album), 2008
 The Other (album), by King Tuff, or the title song, 2018
 "The Other", a song by Lauv from I Met You When I Was 18 (The Playlist), 2018
 "The Other", a song by Tonight Alive from Underworld, 2018

Human name
 Othoere, or Other, a contemporary of Alfred the Great
Other, father of Walter Fitz Other, castellan of Windsor in the time of William the Conqueror
 Other Windsor (disambiguation), several people 
 Other Robert Ivor Windsor-Clive, 3rd Earl of Plymouth (1923–2018)
 Other C. Wamsley, a builder in Hamilton, Montana
 The Other (Doctor Who), a fictional character

Other uses
 Other Music, a defunct music store in New York City
 OtherOS, a feature available in early versions of the PlayStation 3 console

See also
 Another (disambiguation)
 Others (disambiguation)
 Otherness (disambiguation)